Kenney is a given name and surname of Irish, Scottish, and English origin. In Ireland, the surname is an Anglicisation of the Irish Ó Cionnaith. It is also a variation of Kenny, MacKenny, O'Kenney, or Keaney.

Given name
Kenney Bertz (born 1983), American soccer player
Charles Kenney Duncan (1911–1994), United States Navy admiral
Kenney Funderburk (born 1992), American professional basketball player
Kenney Jones (born 1948), English drummer
Kenney Krysko, Florida herpetologist
Kenney Mencher (born 1965), American painter
Mary Kenney O'Sullivan (1864–1943), organizer in the early U.S. labor movement
Kenney Walker (born 1988), American soccer player

Surname
Anne Kenney, American television producer and writer
Anne R. Kenney (born 1950), librarian and archivist
Annie Kenney (1879–1953), English suffragette
Art Kenney (1916–2014), pitcher in Major League Baseball
Arthur Kenney (disambiguation)
Arthur Kenney (basketball) (born 1946), American basketball center
Arthur Kenney (priest) (died 1855), Irish priest, Dean of Achonry
Ben Kenney (born 1977), American musician
Beverly Kenney (1932–1960), American jazz singer
Bill Kenney (born 1955), American football player and politician
Bill Kenney (American football coach), American football coach
Bob Kenney (1931–2014), American basketball player
Bryn Kenney (born 1986), American professional poker player
Cam Kenney, New Hampshire politician
Casey Kenney (born 1991), American mixed martial artist
Chad F. Kenney (born 1955), United States District Judge
Charles Lamb Kenney (1821–1881), British writer
Clarence Kenney (1882–1950), American football player and coach
Con Kenney (1896–1959), Australian rules footballer
Crane Kenney, Major League Baseball executive
David T. Kenney (1866–1922), American inventor with nine patents
Dennis Kenney, American actor, singer, dancer
Donald Kenney (born 1938), American politician
Douglas Kenney (1946–1980), American writer and actor, co-founder of National Lampoon
Ed Kenney (1933–2018), American singer and actor
Edward Kenney (disambiguation)
Edward Aloysius Kenney (1884–1938), American politician
Edward John Kenney (1924–2019), British Latin professor
Edward Patrick Kenney (1888–?), Australian World War I flying ace
Edward Tourtellotte Kenney (1888–1974), merchant, agent and political figure in British Columbia
Emma Kenney (born 1999), American actress
Frederick J. Kenney, American Rear Admiral, Judge Advocate General of the US Coast Guard
Gene Kenney (born 1928), American wrestler, football player and soccer coach
George Kenney (1889–1977), United States Army Air Forces general in World War II
George T. Kenney (born 1957), Republican member of the Pennsylvania House of Representatives
H. Wesley Kenney (1926–2015), American television producer and director
Heather North Kenney (1945–2017), American television and voice actress
James Kenney (disambiguation)
James Kenney (dramatist) (1780–1849), English dramatist
James J. Kenney (1869–1916), American firefighter, first fire chief of Berkeley, California
Jenny (Jane) Kenney (1884–1961) also known as Jennie, British suffragette and Montessori teacher, sister of Annie Kenney
Jason Kenney (born 1968), Canadian politician
Jenny (Jane) Kenney (1884-1961), English suffragette
Jerry Kenney (born 1945), American Major League Baseball infielder
Jessie Kenney (1887–1985), English suffragette
Jessika Kenney, experimental vocalist, composer, and teacher
Jim Kenney (born 1958), American Democratic politician
Joe Kenney, American football player and coach
John Kenney (disambiguation)
John Kenney (baseball) (1844–1893), American professional baseball player
John A. Kenney Jr. (1914–2003), American dermatologist
John T. Kenney (1911–1972), English illustrator
Joseph Kenney (born 1960), American politician
June Kenney (1933–2021), American actress
Kitty Kenney (1880–1952), English suffragette
Kristie Kenney (born 1955), career U.S. diplomat
Larry Kenney (born 1947), American radio personality and voice actor
Laura Kenney (born 1985), Scottish long-distance runner
Lawrence Joyce Kenney (1930–1990), American Roman Catholic bishop
Lelon Kenney (1935–2018), American politician, farmer, and businessman
Leo Kenney (1925–2001), American abstract painter
Madeline Kenney, American singer-songwriter
Mart Kenney (1910–2006), Canadian musician and bandleader
Matthew Kenney (born 1964), American Celebrity chef and author
Michael Kenney, musician in the English band Iron Maiden
Mick Kenney (born 1980), British musician, artist, and record producer
Mo Kenney (born 1990), Canadian singer/songwriter
Nell Kenney (1876–1953), English suffragette
Padraic Kenney (born 1963), American historian, writer, and professor
Pat Kenney (born 1968), American professional wrestler also known as Simon Diamond
Peter Kenney (1779–1841), Irish Jesuit priest
Phyllis Gutiérrez Kenney, American politician of the Democratic Party
Raymond Kenney, fictional hacker from the game Watch Dogs
R. C. Kenney, American college sports coach
Richard Kenney (disambiguation)
Richard Kenney (missionary), missionary to Bombay
Richard Kenney (poet) (born 1948), poet and professor of English
Richard R. Kenney (1856–1931), American lawyer and politician
Robyn Kenney (born 1979), American field hockey player
Sean Kenney (disambiguation)
Sean Kenney (actor) (born 1944), American actor
Sean Kenney (artist) (born 1976), New York-based artist
Seth H. Kenney (1836-1917), American farmer and politician
Skip Kenney, American swimming coach
Steve Kenney (born 1955), professional American football player
Susan Kenney (born 1941), American short story writer and novelist
Ted Kenney (born 1966), Director, Field and Technical Operations at Fox Sports
Tim Kenney, director of athletics for St. Bonaventure University
Vin Kenney (1892–1959), Australian rules footballer
W. John Kenney (1904–1992), United States Assistant Secretary of the Navy
William Kenney (1870–1939), president of the Great Northern Railway
Вымышленные персонажи:
 Кенни Маккормик - из мультсериала "Южный Парк"

See also
 Senator Kenney (disambiguation)
 Kenney (disambiguation)
 Kenney family
 Kinney (disambiguation)
 Kenny (disambiguation)

References 

Surnames of Irish origin
Anglicised Irish-language surnames